Braking unit also some times referred as Dynamic braking unit may refer to:

 DC injection braking unit, an electrical braking device for ac motors
 Regenerative braking unit, regenerative braking systems used in traction motors
 Electromagnetic brake, devices using electromagnetic forces to mechanically brake
 Braking chopper, an electronic switch used to dissipate high voltage in an intermediate circuit

id:Braking unit